Antes may refer to:

 Antes people, inhabiting parts of Eastern Europe in the Early Middle Ages
 Plural of Ante (poker)
 "Antes" (song), 2021 song by Anuel AA
 Antes (surname)

See also

Henry Antes House, historic house in Upper Frederick Township, Pennsylvania, US
Fort Antes, stockade in Pennsylvania, US, built by Colonel John Antes c. 1778
Ante (disambiguation)
Antos (name)